Oji River is a Local Government Area of Enugu State, Nigeria to the south bordering Anambra State and Abia State. Its headquarters are in the town of Oji River.
The towns within Oji River L G A are:- Inyi, Achi Agụ, Achị Ụlọ, Awlaw, Akpugoeze, Oji-River Urban and Ugwuoba.

It has an area of 403 km2 and a population of 126,587 at the 2006 census.

The postal code of the area is 401.

The Oji River thermal power station in Oji River in Enugu state, Nigeria, is one of the small satellite power stations built in the South-East of Nigeria before Independence of 1960 and the commissioning of the large National Hydroelectricity power station in Kainji Dam/Jebba Dam.

It was built to produce 10MW Capacity of Electricity. With the aid of the river alongside the site and coal transported from Enugu Coal site on overhead cable buckets 50 km away. After the Nigeria - Biafra civil war, the thermal power station was upgraded to 30MW, supplying electricity the immediate area and also some parts of Udi, Achi area.

28 January 1956: Queen Elizabeth II, on a three-week visit to Nigeria, during which she visited the leper settlement and newly built power station, at Oji river in East Nigeria.
The plant reportedly last generated power in 2004. The Nigeria government has debated plans for recommissioning the plant, considering that its water level has drastically gone down such that it cannot power its turbines to generate electricity, as well as the closed coal mines at Enugu city.

Oji River town has one of the largest and oldest running leprosy rehabilitation settlements in the south-east, bordering Anambra state. It had been originally set up by English missionary churches in the 1930s in Nigeria. 
In 1944, the then Governor of Nigeria Sir Arthur Richards visited the Uzuakoli Leper Settlement officially. Following this visit, the Nigerian government took active interest in missionary activities to eradicate leprosy in Nigeria by taking over the Oji River Leprosy Settlement from the Church Missionary Society (CMS now Anglican). It also built a Leprosy Control Centre at Oji River.

Most people from Oji River are Christians with majority either practising Catholics or Anglicans while the rest practise local beliefs.

Oji River town hosts one of only four sites nationally, for the Recruitment and training at police cadets in a Police College in Oji River, which also offered training to other security personnel, such as armed immigration officers. The Nigeria Police Force (NPF) is designated by Section 194 of the 1979 constitution as the national police of Nigeria with exclusive jurisdiction throughout the country.

Gallery

See also

References

Local Government Areas in Enugu State
Towns in Enugu State
Local Government Areas in Igboland